Siero is a municipality of the province and autonomous community of Asturias, in northern Spain. Its capital is Pola de Siero.

Parishes

Politics

Councillors distribution in local elections

References

External links

Concejo de Siero

 
Municipalities in Asturias